Kalyan Banerjee (Bengali: কল্যাণ বন্দ্যোপাধ্যায়; born 4 January 1957) is a member of the All India Trinamool Congress. He has won the 2019 Indian general elections from the Serampore (Lok Sabha constituency).
He was earlier elected for the 16th Lok Sabha from the same constituency.

Kalyan education qualification is  B.Com. and LL.B. He is a well known advocate, who has been frequently taking up numerous cases for Trinamool Congress. He has been practicing in Calcutta High Court since 1981. Some of the cases he handled are of  Rizwanur Rahman Case, matters relating to Nandigram, Chhota Angaria Case, Bhikari Paswan Case, Imposition of Sec-144 in Singur and different land acquisition cases.

He visited U.K. and U.S.A. as a member of a parliamentary team in October 2009.

References

Living people
India MPs 2014–2019
Trinamool Congress politicians from West Bengal
India MPs 2009–2014
Lok Sabha members from West Bengal
People from Hooghly district
1957 births
20th-century Indian lawyers
Indian Hindus
India MPs 2019–present
Indian National Congress politicians from West Bengal